David Leonel Faleiro, commonly known as Kaká (born 12 January 1991 in Sapucaia do Sul), is a Brazilian football midfield playmaker who most notably for the Zemplín Michalovce and Senica.

Career

FK Senica 
In January 2011, he joined Slovak club FK Senica on a three-year contract. He made his debut for Senica against FC Nitra on 4 March 2011.  On 21 February David was released.

MFK Zemplín Michalovce 
In August 2011, he joined Zemplín Michalovce. Kaká made his debut for Zemplín against Dubnica on 13 August 2011.

External links 
at fksenica.sk

References 

1991 births
Living people
Brazilian footballers
Brazilian expatriate footballers
Association football midfielders
Cerâmica Atlético Clube players
FK Senica players
Slovak Super Liga players
2. Liga (Slovakia) players
MFK Zemplín Michalovce players
Expatriate footballers in Slovakia
Brazilian expatriate sportspeople in Slovakia
Sportspeople from Rio Grande do Sul